Ellen Read (born ) is a New Hampshire politician.

Career
On November 8, 2016, Read was elected to the New Hampshire House of Representatives where she represents the Rockingham 17 district. Read assumed office in 2016. Read is a Democrat. Read endorses Bernie Sanders in the 2020 Democratic Party presidential primaries.

Personal life
Read resides in Newmarket, New Hampshire.

References

Living people
Women state legislators in New Hampshire
People from Newmarket, New Hampshire
Democratic Party members of the New Hampshire House of Representatives
21st-century American women politicians
21st-century American politicians
Year of birth missing (living people)